Southside Story may refer to:

Southside Story (Big Mello album), 1996
Southside Story (compilation), a 2000 New Zealand compilation album
South Side Story (2007 TV series), a six-part observational documentary series about the South Sydney Rabbitohs
South Side Story (2014 TV series), a six-part television series on BBC Three

See also
 East Side Story (disambiguation)
 West Side Story (disambiguation)